The following tables list the global geological sites where tracks of theropod dinosaurs have been found, together with the proper names of the rock formations (stratigraphic units) that contain them.

Non-avian theropods

Avialans

See also

List of dinosaur-bearing rock formations
List of fossil sites

Footnotes

References
 Weishampel, David B.; Dodson, Peter; and Osmólska, Halszka (eds.): The Dinosauria, 2nd, Berkeley: University of California Press. 861 pp. .

Theropod tracks
Dinosaur trace fossils
Prehistoric theropods